Anastasiya Huchok  is a wrestler from Belarus. She won the bronze medal the 2014 World Wrestling Championships.

References

External links 
 

Living people
Belarusian female sport wrestlers
Year of birth missing (living people)
Place of birth missing (living people)
Wrestlers at the 2015 European Games
European Games competitors for Belarus
World Wrestling Championships medalists
Sportspeople from Minsk
21st-century Belarusian women